Gid is an unincorporated community in Izard County, Arkansas, United States.

History
Gid is the name of Gid Bruce. The community received its name in 1888 when promoters of a post office couldn't agree on a name, and so decided to name it for whoever walked in next.

References

Unincorporated communities in Izard County, Arkansas
Unincorporated communities in Arkansas